Davis Kamoga (born July 17, 1968) is a Ugandan athlete competing in 400 m. He won the bronze medal at the 1996 Summer Olympics in Atlanta, Georgia.

In 1997 he won the first Ugandan medal at the World Championships, a silver medal in the 1997 World Championships in Athens in a personal best time of 44.37 seconds. This is the national record, and ranks him fourth in Africa, behind Innocent Egbunike, Samson Kitur and Charles Gitonga.

References

External links

1968 births
Living people
Ugandan male sprinters
Olympic athletes of Uganda
Athletes (track and field) at the 1996 Summer Olympics
Athletes (track and field) at the 2000 Summer Olympics
Olympic bronze medalists for Uganda
World Athletics Championships medalists
Medalists at the 1996 Summer Olympics
Olympic bronze medalists in athletics (track and field)
20th-century Ugandan people
21st-century Ugandan people